Cathedral of the Holy Martyrs, in Gyumri, Armenia, is the cathedral of the Ordinariate for Armenia, Georgia, Russia, and Eastern Europe of the Armenian Catholic Church. It is located on the Victory (Haghtanak) Avenue, next to the Dzitoghtsyan Museum of National Architecture. Construction began in December 2010 and was completed in 2015. The cathedral was originally to be named "Holy Cross", but changed to "Holy Martyrs" in honour of the canonized martyrs of the Armenian genocide.

Architecture
The church of the Holy Martyrs is a pastiche of forms derived from medieval Armenian architecture, in particular Zvartnots. It has a belfry at its entrance. The architect is Hakob Jivanyan, while the construction engineer is Hakob Baghdasaryan. The decorative sculptures are composed by Razmik Ayvazyan.

Consecration
On 24 September 2015, the cathedral was consecrated by Krikor Bedros XX Gabroyan, Catholicos-Patriarch of the Armenian Catholic Church, and Leonardo Sandri, Prefect of the Congregation for the Oriental Churches. The ceremony was held as part of the commemoration of the centennial of the Armenian genocide. The cathedral is named "Holy Martyrs" in memory of victims of the Armenian genocide (in 2015 the Armenian Apostolic Church canonized them as martyrs).

Papal visit
On 25 June 2016, Pope Francis, accompanied by Catholicos Karekin II, visited the cathedral.

Gallery

See also
Catholic Church in Armenia

References

External links
 Official website of Ordinariate
 Original church design and video of construction
 Video of consecration
 President of Armenia official website article with photos
 Slaq.am article with photos
 News.am article with video and photos
 Public Radio of Armenia article
 Massisport.com article

Buildings and structures in Gyumri
Churches completed in 2015
Tourist attractions in Shirak Province
2015 establishments in Armenia
Eastern Catholic cathedrals in Armenia
Armenian Catholic cathedrals
Armenian Catholic churches in Armenia